Platytes vobisne is a moth in the family Crambidae. It was described by Harrison Gray Dyar Jr. in 1920. It has been recorded from the US states of Illinois, Indiana, Kansas, Massachusetts, Michigan, Minnesota, South Dakota and Wisconsin. The habitat consists of grasslands.

The wingspan is 12–13 mm. Adults have been recorded on wing from May to July.

References

Crambini
Moths described in 1920
Moths of North America